Plaumannimyia costaemaculata is a species of fruit fly in the genus Plaumannimyia of the family Tephritidae.

Distribution
Brazil.

References

Tephritinae
Insects described in 1940
Diptera of South America